Ian Ogilvie (24 April 1922 – 1985) was a Scottish footballer who played for Dumbarton.

Ogilvie died in Forfar in 1985, at the age of 63.

References

1922 births
1985 deaths
Scottish footballers
Dumbarton F.C. players
Scottish Football League players
Association football goalkeepers